Devon Roy Martinus (born 28 January 1993 in Bredasdorp, South Africa) is a South African rugby union player for  in the Currie Cup and in the Rugby Challenge. His regular position is prop.

Career

UWC

Marthinus made his mark in the 2012 Varsity Shield competition for university side , playing in all eight of their matches in the competition to help them finish in third position.

Golden Lions

He made his first start in their next match against their trans-Jukskei River rivals , again ending on the losing side as the Blue Bulls ran out 54–26 winners. He made one more appearance – again in a loss as the  beat them 30–19 in Welkom.

His performances didn't go unnoticed by the South African Under-20 selectors, however, and he was included in the squad that played at the 2013 IRB Junior World Championship. Marthinus only made one appearance at the tournament, a 26–19 victory over hosts France which helped them secure top spot in Pool A. South Africa eventually finished third in the competition, losing to Wales in the semi-final, but beating New Zealand in the third-place play-off.

He returned to domestic action to make eleven appearances in the ' 2013 Under-21 Provincial Championship season, helping them secure a semi-final spot by finishing fourth on the log, where they lost 41–44 after extra time to eventual winners .

Leopards (loan)

Griquas

He joined Kimberley-based side  for the 2016 season.

References

South African rugby union players
Living people
1993 births
People from Cape Agulhas Local Municipality
Rugby union props
Golden Lions players
Leopards (rugby union) players
South Africa Under-20 international rugby union players
Rugby union players from the Western Cape